Beyza Durmaz (born 5 August 1977) is a Turkish singer, songwriter, and composer.

Life and career 
Having completed her high school education at the Private Culture High School, Durmaz took various courses in singing, guitar, piano and Turkish Art Music, at the same period while she was studying at the Faculty of Business Administration of Istanbul University, and then joined the group "Nefes" as a soloist. After graduating from university, she began to perform as Mustafa Sandal's back vocalist.

She was first featured on Burak Demir's album Dreamin' İstanbul as a guest vocalist. Durmaz's first album Koku was released in 2005. It was produced by Volkan Gucer and composed by Burak Demir. The songs on this album were written by Durmaz herself. She also sang the song for the main title of the series Sihirli Annem which was broadcast for 7 seasons.

She also collaborated with the Italian group Nemas Project on the album "Snow in Istanbul". Together with Ali Cem Çehreli, Durmaz also wrote and composed the song "Hüsran" for Mustafa Ceceli's album "Kalpten".

In 2015, she released a music video for the song "Olan Var Olmayan Var". The song ranked eighth on Google's list of most-searched songs in Turkey in 2015.

Discography 
Albums
 Koku (2005)

EPs
 Olan Var Olmayan Var (2015)

Singles
 "Ben N'aptım" (2016)
 "Miras" (2018)
 "Wake Up" (feat. ToldorTunes) (2019)

Awards and nominations

References

External links 
 
 

1977 births
Turkish pop singers
Living people
21st-century Turkish singers
21st-century Turkish women singers